Jean Canavaggio (born 23 July 1936) is a French biographer and former emeritus professor of Spanish literature at the Paris West University Nanterre La Défense.

Biography 
A former student of the École normale supérieure (class 1956), Jean Canavaggio is a biographer and specialist of Cervantès. In 2001, he directed a new translation of his complete novels in the Bibliothèque de la Pléiade. From 1988 to 1992, he was president of the jury of external agrégation of Spanish. From 1996 to 2001, he was director of the Casa de Velázquez at Madrid. He is corresponding member of the Real Academia de la Lengua and the Real Academia de la Historia (Madrid) and honorary fellow of the Hispanic Society of America (New York). His work in the Cervantian domain is now authoritative.

Articles  
(complete list) 
1958: Alonso López Pinciano y la estética literaria de Cervantes en el Quijote, Anales cervantinos, 8, pp. 13-108.
1966: A propos de deux « comedias » de Cervantès: quelques remarques sur un manuscrit récemment retrouvé, Bulletin hispanique, 68, pp. 5–29.
1972: Variations cervantines sur le thème du théâtre au théâtre, Revue des Sciences humaines, 37, pp. 53–68
1976: Teatro y comediantes en el Siglo de Oro: algunos datos inéditos, Segismundo, 12, pp. 27–51.
1977: Cervantes en primera persona, Journal of Hispanic Philology, 2, pp. 35–44.
1984: La dimensión autobiográfica del Viaje del Parnaso, Cervantes, 1, pp. 29–41.
1984: Publications récentes sur le théâtre du Siècle d'Or, Bulletin hispanique, 86, pp. 215-219.
1989: Agi Morato, de historia a ficción, Crítica hispánica, 11, pp. 17-22.
1994: La figura del rey en el teatro de Cervantes, Crítica hispánica, 16, pp. 31–42.
2003: L'Espagne du Persiles, Les Langues Néo-latines, nº  237, December, pp. 21–38
2004: Don Quijote, vencedor del Caballero de los Espejos : el epílogo de un triunfo por escarnio (II, 16), Bulletin of Spanish Studies, 81, pp. 495–499. 
2013: Don Quichotte : un mythe pour notre temps ? - Revue "Études" May (Tome 418), pp 653– 664

Collective works

Coordination  
(some references)
1988: Le Siècle d'Or espagnol, n° spécial de XVIIe Siècle, 40th year, n° 160, 54 p. (presentation and coordination). 
1993–1994: Histoire de la Littérature espagnole (general coor. and collab.), Paris, Fayard, tome I, 1993; tome II, 1994, 830 p. (Spanish translation, Barcelona, Ariel, 1994–95, 6 volumes).
1995: El Siglo de Oro de las Letras en España : invención y avatares de un concepto (coord.), Mélanges de la Casa de Velázquez, 31-2, p, 145-230.
2001: Cervantès, œuvres romanesques complètes : t. I, Don Quichotte, précédé de La Galatée ; t. II, Nouvelles exemplaires, suivies de Persilès et Sigismunda, introduction, traduction et notes, av. la collaboration de Claude Allaigre, Michel Moner et Jean-Marc Pelorson, Paris, Gallimard, Bibliothèque de La Pléiade

Participation 
(some titles)
1965: L'Espagne au temps de Philippe II (in collaboration with P. Vilar, P. Chaunu, H. Lapeyre, M. Devèze and P. Guinard), Paris, Hachette
1981: Las figuras del donaire en las comedias de Cervantes, Risa y sociedad en el teatro del Siglo de Oro, Toulouse, CNRS, pp. 51-67.
1984: Refranero et comedia dans l'Espagne du Siècle d'Or: quatre personnages en quête d'auteur, Le personnage dans la littérature du Siècle d'Or, Paris, pp. 81-88
1990: L'Espagne de Don Quichotte, La Méditerranée occidentale au XVIe, Actes du Colloque de 1989 de l'Association des Historiens Modernistes, n° 14, Paris, pp. 111-124 (Spanish translation « La España del Quijote », Insula, n° 538, Oct. 1991, p. 7-8).
2004: La muerte deseada en las obras de Cervantes, Carlos Romero Muñoz (ed.), Le mappe nascoste di Cervantes, Treviso, Santi Quaranta, pp. 9–24.

Works 
1977: Cervantès dramaturge: un théâtre à naître, Paris, Presses universitaires de France
1986: Cervantès, Paris, Mazarine, 1986 (bourse Goncourt de la biographie) (Spanish, Italian, German, English, Japanese, Portuguese translations)
1993–1994: Histoire de la littérature espagnole (coord. and collab.), Fayard, tome 1, 1993; tome 2, 1994. (Spanish translation, Barcelona, Ariel, 1994-1995, 6 volumes
1995: La Comedia, Madrid, Casa de Velázquez (CCV, 48)
2000: Un mundo abreviado: aproximaciones al teatro aureo, Madrid/Frankfurt am Main, Iberoamericana/Vervuert
2000: Cervantes entre vida y creacion, Alcala de Henares
2001: Cervantès, Œuvres romanesques complètes, t. I, Don Quichotte, preceded by La Galatée; t. II, Nouvelles exemplaires, suivies de Persilès et Segismunda, introduction, translation and notes in collaboration with Claude Allaigre, Michel Moner and Jean-Marc Pelorson, Paris, Éditions Gallimard, Bibliothèque de la Pléiade
2005: Don Quichotte, du livre au mythe : quatre siècles d'errance,Fayard; (Spanish and Italian translations in 2006) Prix Roland de Jouvenel of the Académie française - ( Book  downlable here)

Bibliography 
 "Bibliographie des travaux de Jean Canavaggio", in "Por discreto y por amigo". Mélanges offerts à Jean Canavaggio, Christophe Couderc and Benoît Pellistrandi (eds.), Madrid, Casa de Velázquez (CCV, 88), 2005, .

References

External links 
 Jean Canavaggio : Nous sommes tous des Don Quichotte on France Culture
 Interview with J. Canavaggio
 La folie et l’histoire, une lecture du Quichotte on IMAGINEM
 Don Quichotte ou l'éternelle chevauchée in L'Express

French biographers
Don Quixote
École Normale Supérieure alumni
French Hispanists
Prix Goncourt de la Biographie winners
1936 births
Living people
Corresponding members of the Real Academia de la Historia